Lee Kyung-Hwan (March 21, 1988 – April 14, 2012) was a South Korean football player. He played for Daejeon Citizen and Suwon Bluewings.

Lee was involved in match-fixing scandal while playing for Daejeon Citizen. On the basis of the prosecution's investigation, it was confirmed in August 2011 that he would be banned from playing in the all football leagues in South Korea.

He committed suicide in Incheon on 14 April 2012, at age 24, after jumping off an apartment building. Lee was pronounced dead on the way to the hospital.

References

External links
 

1988 births
2012 deaths
Association football midfielders
South Korean footballers
Daejeon Hana Citizen FC players
Suwon Samsung Bluewings players
K League 1 players
Suicides by jumping in South Korea
2012 suicides
Match fixers